King's Variety Store was a chain of discount stores founded in 1915 by M.H. King in Burley, Idaho. At its peak, King's had 27 stores in Idaho, Montana, Nevada, Oregon, Utah, and Wyoming.

Most King's stores were located in smaller towns that only had a grocery store as its major retail store.

In February 2017, King's announced it would close all of its stores, and ceased operations that May.

References

Companies based in Idaho
Economy of the Northwestern United States
Defunct discount stores of the United States
Retail companies established in 1915
Retail companies disestablished in 2017
1915 establishments in Idaho